Johann Samuel Beyer (1669 in Gotha – 9 May 1744 in Karlsbad) was a German composer and writer of a manual on singing (1703).

Works, editions, recordings
His works are available in a modern edition and include a Christmas cantata entitled Heilig ist Gott.

References

1669 births
1744 deaths
German Baroque composers
18th-century classical composers
German classical composers
German male classical composers
18th-century German composers
18th-century German male musicians